Sir Lambert Wilfred Alexander de Soysa also known as Sir Wilfred de Soysa (20 Feb 1884 - 3 May 1968)  was a Ceylonese entrepreneur, landed proprietor and philanthropist. He was the seventh son of Sir Charles Henry de Soysa and Lady Catherine de Soysa. Born at Alfred House Colombo and educated privately, then at Royal College, Colombo and Prince of Wales' College, Moratuwa, he completed his studies at the Royal Agricultural College, England.

De Soysa was successful as a tea, rubber and coconut planter and established the firm De Soysa & Co. He was also a member of the Ceylon National Association and was part of the Lanka Mahajana Sabha delegation to the Donoughmore Commission. 
He was a proprietor of the Ceylon Morning Leader newspaper and had played host to the young Hirohito and Rabindranath Tagore. He was knighted in the 1938 New Year Honours as a Knights Bachelor.  

De Soysa married Senator Evelyn Yohana (née Fernando) and their first son Harold de Soysa was the first Ceylonese Anglican Bishop of Colombo. His second son Cecil de Soysa was the founding Chairman of the Ceylon Tourist Board and the Chairman of Ceylon Shipping Lines. In 1954 his third son Terence de Soysa was appointed as the first Sri Lankan Chairman of the Ceylon Chamber of Commerce His fourth son Ryle de Soysa was the opening batsman for the All-Ceylon (National Team) between 1938–45 and represented the Oxford University, the Sinhalese Sports Club (of which he was later president) and captained the Royal College, Colombo first XI team to Australia in 1936.

References

External links
 Chloe de Soysa Collection 
 Tribute to the Bawa Brothers
 Kodigaha Kanda forest sanctuary

Ceylonese Knights Bachelor
Sinhalese businesspeople
Sri Lankan Christians
Sri Lankan philanthropists
Alumni of Prince of Wales' College, Moratuwa
People from Colombo
People from Moratuwa
Wilfred
Alumni of the Royal Agricultural University
Alumni of Royal College, Colombo